Maati Balidan Ki is a 1986 film based on partiot.star cast Sandhu Raj, Anu Dhawan, Rama Vij and Shiv Kumar. Produced & directed by Shiv Kumar. Music by Ravindra Jain.

Cast
 Sandhu Raj 
 Anu Dhawan 
 Rama Vij 
 Krishna Sharma
 Ramesh Goyal 
 Raghvendra Singh Solanky
 Aarti Pathak

Music Department
 Anuradha Paudwal ....  playback singer
 Suresh Wadkar ....  playback singer
 Chandrani Mukherjee .... playback singer (as Aarti Mukherjee) 
 Jaspal Singh ....  playback singer 
 Dilraj Kaur ....  playback singer 
 Hemlata ....  playback singer (as Hemlata) 
 Susheel Kumar....  playback singer 
 Ravindra Jain ....  playback singer

References

1986 films
1980s Hindi-language films